Milward Adams (January 6, 1857January 18, 1923) was born in Lexington, Kentucky.

Adams rose to prominence as the first manager of the Chicago Symphony Orchestra and the Auditorium Theatre. Adams worked his way up in the performing arts world, beginning as a janitor at various theaters and ending as a theater manager with many connections in the Chicago arts scene.

He managed the great May musical festivals of 1882 and 1884; also summer night concerts under the direction of Theodore Thomas for ten years.

References

External links 
 Milward Adams Photograph Collection at Newberry Library

1857 births
1923 deaths
Businesspeople from Lexington, Kentucky
American theatre managers and producers